The De Mores Memorial Park in Medora, North Dakota was listed on the National Register of Historic Places in 2019.

It includes a 1926 bronze statue of the Marquis de Mores, donated by his sons. A 1938 Works Progress Administration project created a flagstone courtyard.

The park's integrity was reported damaged by a hole being cut in its wall.

References

National Register of Historic Places in Billings County, North Dakota
Parks on the National Register of Historic Places in North Dakota
Works Progress Administration in North Dakota